Bargh Tehran Football Club (Bashgah-e Futbal-e Bargh-e Tehran), commonly known as Bargh Tehran, is an Iranian football club based in capital Tehran, that competes in the Tehran Province League. The club was founded in 1950 and is part of the multisport club Bargh Tehran Culture & Sport Institute.

The football team plays its home games at the Harandi Stadium which has a seating capacity of 10,000. The club is owned and supported by the Tehran Province Electricity Distribution Company.

top players 1982 : Majid Holekian - Javad Mahmodi - Hamid Nazemi (Invited to national team ) He also played for Turkish team in 1983 and also played for Germany

See also
 Bargh Shiraz

References

External links
 
 

Sport in Tehran
Association football clubs established in 1950
Football clubs in Iran
1950 establishments in Iran